Microcephalus is a genus of beetles in the family Carabidae, containing the following species:

 Microcephalus affinis Tschitscherine, 1898
 Microcephalus amplicollis Chaudoir, 1852
 Microcephalus bolivianus Tschitscherine, 1898
 Microcephalus catharinae Tschitscherine, 1898
 Microcephalus depressicollis Dejean, 1828
 Microcephalus festivus Tschitscherine, 1898
 Microcephalus kaszabi (Straneo, 1959)
 Microcephalus magnificus (Lutshnik, 1935)
 Microcephalus minor Chaudoir, 1852
 Microcephalus niger (Straneo, 1956)
 Microcephalus orientalis (Straneo, 1951)
 Microcephalus paraguayensis (Straneo, 1951)
 Microcephalus peruanus (Lutshnik, 1931)
 Microcephalus subsinuatus (Straneo, 1956)
 Microcephalus superbus Tschitscherine, 1898

References

Pterostichinae
Carabidae genera